(also Ohira, Oohira) is a Japanese surname and place name.

Astronomy 
 8533 Oohira, a main-belt asteroid
 Oohira Station, alternative name for the Nihondaira Observatory

Places 
 Ōhira, Miyagi, a village located in Kurokawa District, Miyagi, Japan
 Ōhira, Tochigi, a former town located in Shimotsuga District, Tochigi, Japan

People 
 Ichiji Ohira, member of the Japanese rock band, Anzen Chitai
 Masayoshi Ōhira (1910–1980), 68th and 69th Prime Minister of Japan
 Minoru Ohira (born 1950), Japanese-born artist
 Motoori Ōhira (1756–1833), scholar of Kokugaku
 Shuzo Ohira (1930–1998), professional Go player
 Takayuki Ohira (born 1970), Japanese engineer and the creator of the Megastar, a world record-holding planetarium projector 
 Takehiro Ōhira, professional shogi player
 Tōru Ōhira (1929–2016), Japanese voice actor